Shine Through is the debut album by American musician Aloe Blacc. The album, released on Stones Throw, is mostly produced by Aloe himself, but also features production from Oh No and Madlib. The instrumental version of the album was released on vinyl and made available for MP3 download purchase on the Stones Throw website.

Track listing

Personnel

References

External links
Shine Through on Stones Throw
Aloe Blacc official site
Aloe Blacc on MySpace
Aloe Blacc on Stones Throw
Stones Throw Records

2006 debut albums
Stones Throw Records albums
Albums produced by Madlib
Albums produced by Oh No (musician)
Aloe Blacc albums